Bornum can refer to the following places in Germany:

 Bornum, Saxony-Anhalt
 Bornum am Elm, Königslutter, Lower Saxony
 Bornum am Harz, Bockenem, Lower Saxony
 Bornum, Börßum, Lower Saxony
 Bornum, Hanover, Lower Saxony